You're the One is the tenth solo studio album by Paul Simon, released in 2000. The album was nominated for a Grammy Award for Album of the Year in 2001, with Simon becoming the first artist to be nominated in that category in five consecutive decades (1960s-2000s). (In 2006, Paul McCartney became the only other artist to match this feat with Chaos and Creation in the Backyard).

You're the One was also considered a comeback after the failure of Simon's Broadway musical, The Capeman, and concept album for the musical, Songs from The Capeman, which peaked at #42 on the Billboard 200.

The album was remastered and re-released in 2004, accompanied with three bonus live tracks.

Track listing
All songs written and arranged by Paul Simon.

Side one

Side two

Bonus tracks from the 2004 reissue of the album

Personnel 
 Paul Simon – vocals, electric guitar (1-4, 6, 7, 8, 10), acoustic guitar (7, 8, 10), sitar (8)
 Alain Mallet – Wurlitzer electric piano (1), reed organ (4, 7, 11)
 Clifford Carter – celesta (2, 6, 10), keyboard glockenspiel (10)
 Vincent Nguini – electric guitar (1-4, 6, 8, 9, 10), acoustic guitar (10)
 Mark Stewart – electric guitar (2), cello (2), dobro (7, 9), sitar (7), pedal steel gong (9), banjo (10), trumpet (11)
 Larry Campbell – pedal steel guitar (5, 6)
 Jay Elfenbein – vihuela (1, 2, 11), vielle (1)
 Bakithi Kumalo – bass (1-4, 7, 8, 9)
 Peter Herbert – electric upright bass (4, 11)
 Abraham Laboriel – bass (5, 6, 10)
 Steve Gadd – drums (1-7, 9, 10)
 Jamey Haddad – percussion (1-10)
 Steve Shehan – percussion (1-10)
 Dan Duggan – hammered dulcimer (10) 
 Steve Gorn – bamboo flute (1, 5, 6, 8)
 Evan Ziporyn – clarinet (1, 5), tenor saxophone (2, 4), soprano saxophone (3)
 Andy Snitzer – tenor saxophone (2, 4), soprano saxophone (3)
 Howard Levy – harmonica (5)
 Skip LaPlante – harp (7, 11), steel bowls (11), whirly tube (11)
 Stanley Silverman – French horn arrangements (2, 5)

Production 
 Paul Simon – producer, arrangements 
 Andy Smith – recording, mixing 
 Claudius Mittendorfer – second engineer 
 Rob Murphy – second engineer 
 Steve Schweidel – second engineer 
 Jim Corona – music technician, logistics technician
 Nika Aldrich – technical support
 Flip Scipio – technical support
 Brent Spear – technical support
 Bob Ludwig – mastering at Gateway Mastering (Portland, Maine)
 Vaughn Hazell – personal assistant 
 Greg Foley – design 
 Lynn Goldsmith – art direction, photography 
 Jeffrey Kramer – management
 Eddie Simon – management

Charts and certifications

Weekly charts

Certifications

References

Paul Simon albums
2000 albums
Warner Records albums
Albums produced by Paul Simon